Ouchi Station may refer to:

 Ōuchi Station, a railway station on the Yodo Line in Uwajima, Ehime Prefecture, Japan.
 Ouchi station (Ningbo Rail Transit), a metro station in Ningbo, Zhejiang Province, China.